Sandy Narrows 184C is an Indian reserve of the Peter Ballantyne Cree Nation in Saskatchewan. It is 50 miles northwest of Flin Flon.

References

Indian reserves in Saskatchewan
Division No. 18, Saskatchewan
Peter Ballantyne Cree Nation